Hoseynabad-e Rashtkhvar (also Romanized as Ḩoseynābād-e Rashtkhvār; also known as Ḩoseynābād and Husainābād) is a village in Roshtkhar Rural District, in the Central District of Roshtkhar County, Razavi Khorasan Province, Iran. At the 2006 census, its population was 662, in 151 families.

References 

Populated places in Roshtkhar County